Scopula graphidata is a moth of the  family Geometridae. It is found on Sulawesi.

References

Moths described in 1920
graphidata
Moths of Indonesia